Miss Uruguay is a national beauty pageant in Uruguay that selects Uruguay representatives to compete in three of the big four major international beauty pageants: the Miss World, Miss Universe and Miss Earth competitions.

History
Began in 1952 the committee of Miss Uruguay held Miss Uruguay for Miss Universe the first time. Between 1965 and 1979 the pageant was broadcast on TV under Miguel Angel Viera Bruchou. The Miss Uruguay constantly sends its winner to the Miss Universe and runner-up to Miss World. In addition, Miss Uruguay winners may compete to Miss International, Reina Hispanoamericana, Miss Intercontinental, Miss United Continents, Reina Internacional del Café and Miss America Latina.

Franchise holders

In 2000 due to financial support, Miss Uruguay lost the Miss International franchise. Started in that year, Miss Uruguay selects its winner to only Miss Universe and first runner-up to Miss World.

In 2004 after Mieguel Angel Viera Bruchou directed the Miss Uruguay contest, the Promociones Gloria took over to hold Miss Universo Uruguay pageant where the main winner automatically went to Miss Universe and runner-up participated to Miss World. The Gloria pageant had existed until 2006. In 2006 Antonio Vergara Olmos purchased Miss Universe franchise to Uruguay. The pageant was broadcast on Teledoce (2006–2007) and TV Ciudad (2008–2010). Between 2011 and 2015 the Miss Uruguay held at Conrad Hotel in Punta del Este.

Osmel Sousa, former Miss Venezuela President, took over the Miss Universe license in Uruguay in 2019, and picked a delegate to attend the international pageant.

In 2020, Nadia Cerri, director of the Miss World license in Argentina, took over the Miss World and Miss Universe licenses in Uruguay, and is proceeding to organize separate competitions of Miss Mundo Uruguay and Miss Universo Uruguay.

Titleholders 
The first Miss Uruguay 1952 was Nennella Prunell who withdrew at the Miss Universe 1952 in Long Beach after getting crown of Miss Uruguay. Due to personal reasons, Prunell decided to not compete at the Miss Universe first edition. Her first runner-up, Gladys Rubio Fajardo took over her chance to be the first Miss Universe representative from Uruguay. Began in 2004 the Miss Uruguay Organization renamed as Miss Universo Uruguay and divided the title into the two categories where the main Miss Uruguay named as Miss Universo Uruguay and the second title will be automatically awarded as Miss Mundo Uruguay. TNT Latinoamérica has become an official broadcast network for Uruguay.

Titleholders under Miss Uruguay org.
Miss Universo UruguayMiss Uruguay has been sending representatives in three of the Big Four international beauty pageants. Traditionally, the winner of Miss Uruguay represents her country at the Miss Universe pageant. On occasion, when the winner does not qualify (due to age) for contest, a runner-up is sent.Miss Mundo UruguayThe 1st Runner-up usually represented her country at Miss World. From 2016 to 2017 after Miss Universo Uruguay brand had bought to TNT, the former director Antonio Vergara Olmos (Teledoce Televisión Color) organized the Nuestra Belleza Uruguaya competition.''

Miss Internacional Uruguay

Miss Tierra Uruguay

Miss Supranational Uruguay

References

External links
www.missuniverso.com.uy

 

Miss Universe
Uruguayan awards
Uruguay